Chen Xuya (born ) is a retired female volleyball player. She was part of the China women's national volleyball team.

She participated in the 1994 FIVB Volleyball Women's World Championship. On club level, she played with Sichuan.

Clubs
  Sichuan (1994)

References

1975 births
Living people
Chinese women's volleyball players
Place of birth missing (living people)
20th-century Chinese women